The 2010–11 Arizona Sundogs season was the fifth season of the CHL franchise in Prescott Valley, Arizona.

Regular season

Conference standings

Awards and records

Awards

Milestones

Transactions
The Sundogs have been involved in the following transactions during the 2010–11 season.

Final roster

Affiliates
NHL - Phoenix Coyotes
AHL - San Antonio Rampage

See also
 2010–11 CHL season

References

External links
 2010–11 Arizona Sundogs season at Pointstreak

A
A